Bhaago KK Aaya is an Indian television sitcom series, which premiered on SAB TV on 29 January 2008. The series was produced by Contiloe Entertainment & the story centers on a character name KK, played by Kiku Sharda.

Cast
Kiku Sharda as KK
Navina Bole
Amit Bhatt
Reema Vohra

References

External links
News Article on Tellychakkar.com

Sony SAB original programming
Indian television sitcoms
Indian comedy television series
2008 Indian television series debuts
2008 Indian television series endings